Sabich or sabih is a sandwich of pita or laffa bread stuffed with fried eggplants, hard boiled eggs, chopped salad, parsley, amba and tahini sauce. It is an Iraqi Jewish dish that has become a staple of Israeli cuisine, as a result of Iraqi Jewish immigration to Israel. Its ingredients are based on a traditional quick breakfast of Iraqi Jews and is traditionally made with laffa, which is nicknamed Iraqi pita. Sabich is sold in many businesses throughout Israel.

Etymology

There are several theories on the origin of the name sabich. Many credit the name to the first name of Sabich Tsvi Halabi, a Jewish man born in Iraq who operated a small restaurant in Ramat Gan, and who is credited for originally serving the sandwich. Another theory is that sabich is an acronym of the Hebrew words "Salat, Beitsa, Yoter Ḥatsil" , meaning "salad, egg, more eggplant". This is probably a humorous interpretation and hence a backronym.

History

The idea of the sabich sandwich was most likely brought to Israel by Iraqi Jews, who immigrated in the 1940s and 1950s. On mornings when there was little time for a cooked breakfast, Iraqi Jews ate a cold meal of pre-cooked fried eggplant and hard-boiled eggs, either stuffed into a pita bread or with boiled potatoes. The eggplants would be cooked the night before. 

In Israel, these ingredients eventually became popular as fast food. The dish is said to have been first sold in Israel in 1961 at a small stall on Uziel Street in Ramat Gan. The restaurant was operated by "Sabich" Tzvi Halbi and Yaakov Sasson, the restaurant was very successful, and still operates only 500 meters from where it was originally to this day.   

A version without the bread or pita is called sabich salad ("סלט סביח" - "Salat Sabich" in Hebrew).

Ingredients
Sabich, served in pita bread, traditionally contains fried eggplant slices, hard-cooked eggs, a thin tahini sauce (tahini, lemon juice, and garlic), Israeli Salad, chopped parsley, and amba. Some versions use boiled potatoes. Traditionally it is made with haminados eggs, slow-cooked in hamin until they turn brown. According to the consumer's preference it can be served topped with green or red zhug as a condiment and sprinkled with minced onion.

Gallery

See also
Culture of Israel
Cuisine of the Mizrahi Jews
Israeli cuisine
Jewish cuisine
Middle Eastern cuisine

References

Israeli cuisine
Mizrahi Jewish cuisine
Eggplant dishes
Street food
Egg sandwiches
Vegetarian sandwiches
Shabbat food